Daniel Luton (October 19, 1821 – December 26, 1901) was an Ontario farmer and political figure. He represented Elgin East in the Legislative Assembly of Ontario as a Conservative member from 1867 to 1871.

He was born in Yarmouth Township in 1821, the son of immigrants from England. He served on the council for Elgin County, serving several terms as reeve for the township in 1860 and was warden for the county in 1863. Luton and his family later moved from their farm to St. Thomas.

External links 
Member's parliamentary history for the Legislative Assembly of Ontario
The Canadian parliamentary companion, HJ Morgan (1871)

1821 births
1901 deaths
Progressive Conservative Party of Ontario MPPs
Canadian people of English descent
People from Elgin County